Christiane Cadic (born 8 January 1947) is a French sprinter. She competed in the women's 100 metres at the 1964 Summer Olympics.

References

1947 births
Living people
Athletes (track and field) at the 1964 Summer Olympics
French female sprinters
Olympic athletes of France
Place of birth missing (living people)
Olympic female sprinters